Harley Hugh Dillinger (October 30, 1894 – January 8, 1959), nicknamed "Hoke", was a Major League Baseball pitcher who played for one season. He played for the Cleveland Naps from August 16, 1914, to October 3, 1914. He went to school at the University of Rio Grande and later managed the Paducah Indians of the Kentucky–Illinois–Tennessee League for part of the 1922 season.

External links

1894 births
1959 deaths
Cleveland Naps players
Major League Baseball pitchers
Rio Grande RedStorm baseball players
Ironton Nailers players
Cleveland Spiders (minor league) players
London Tecumsehs (baseball) players
New Orleans Pelicans (baseball) players
Fort Worth Panthers players
Minor league baseball managers
People from Pomeroy, Ohio
Baseball players from Ohio